Samdam ud Daula Shah Nawaz Khan (28 February 1700 – 11 May 1758), a courtier of Qamar-ud-din Khan, Asif Jah I and historian. He compiled the history Ma'asir al-umara.

Shah Nawaz Khan
Shah Nawaz Khan Shams ud Daula was born at Lahore on 28 February 1700, and was originally called 'Abdur Razzak al Husain. Early in life, he went to Aurangbad where most of his relations resided.

Professional life
He was appointed diwan of Berar by 'Asaf Jah; but subsequently had to retire in disgrace into private life for having favoured the revolt of Nasir Jang. After passing five years in seclusion, 'Asaf Jah took him again into favour, and in 1747 reinstated him in the diwani of Berar. He enjoyed the highest honors under Nasir Jang, and became the chief minister under Sulabat Jang. Shah Nawaz played a conspicuous part in the struggles for supremacy between the English and the French; and was assassinated at Aurangbad on 11 May 1758.

Works
The father son duo of Shah Nawaz Khan and Abdul Hai Khan composed the Ma-'asiru-l Umra, a biographical dictionary of the illustrious men who flourished in Hindostan and the Dakhan from the time of Akbar to H. 1155. He was given the title of Shams ud Daula by Asaf Jah.
They resided in the city of Aurangbad. Shah Nawaz Khan was a friend of the great poet Gholam Ali Azad Bilgrami. It was during this period of retirement that Shah Nawaz composed the Ma-'asiru-l Umra, a biographical dictionary of the illustrious men who flourished in Hindustan and the Dakhan from the time of Akbar to AH 1155.

Shams ud Daula Samsam Jang
Samsam ud Daula or Abdul Hai Khan, the son of Shah Nawaz Khan, was born in 1729, and was elevated to the rank of " Khan" in 1748 by Nasir Jang, who also bestowed on him the diwani of Berar. Sulabat Jung made him commandant of Daulatabad; but after the murder of his father Shah Nawaz Khan in 1757, Abdul Hai Khan was imprisoned at Golkonda, till released in 1759 by Nizam 'Ali Khan, who treated him with marked distinction, and reinstated him in his paternal title of Shams ud Daula Samsam Jang. 'Abdul Hai Khan's title at first was Shams ud Daula Dilawar Jang, but he was called Shams ul Mulk, and his poetical name was " Sarim."

Works

He completed his father's manuscripts which had been collected and published by Mir Gholam Ali, and gave them to the world in their present form in 1779.

See also
Ma'asir al-umara
Azad Bilgrami

External links
The full Persian text was published by Asiatic Society of Bengal in the late nineteenth century, and is now available in three pdfs.
Volume 1
Volume 2
Volume 3

References 

Gazetteer Of Aurangabad (1884)

Indian historians of Islam
Prime Ministers of Hyderabad State
1700 births
1758 deaths
People from Lahore
People from Aurangabad, Maharashtra
18th-century Persian-language writers
18th-century Indian historians